1985 is a 2018 American drama film directed by Yen Tan and starring Cory Michael Smith, Virginia Madsen, Michael Chiklis, Aidan Langford, and Jamie Chung. The film is an expansion of an earlier short film of the same name that Tan released in 2016.

Premise
In 1985, Adrian Lester returns home to Dallas to visit his family for Christmas after several years of living in New York City. Adrian, a closeted gay man, has come to tell his family goodbye, but does not want to disclose to them that he is dying of AIDS.

Cast

Production 
The film is a feature-length adaptation of a short film of the same name that was released in 2016. Writer and director Yen Tan said the basis for the films were his experiences of interacting with people who were living with HIV and AIDS at his first job after graduating from college.

The original short film, which starred Lindsay Pulsipher and Robert Sella, centered on a young man with AIDS preparing to move back in with his estranged mother. Unlike the short film, the feature is shot in black-and-white and in 16 mm. Filming took place from May to June 2017.

Release
The film premiered in March 2018 at SXSW. It subsequently screened at a number of LGBT and general-interest film festivals, including as the opening gala at the 2018 Vancouver Queer Film Festival. The movie's DVD and digital release was in December 2018. It also was released in the United Kingdom by Peccadillo Pictures, and was released in Australia, New Zealand and Germany.

Reception
On review aggregate website Rotten Tomatoes, 1985 has an approval rating of 96% based on 52 reviews. The site’s critics consensus reads, "1985 pays tribute to a generation of lost lives with a powerfully made look at how HIV and the social attitudes surrounding homosexuality affect one man's choices."

Glenn Kenny of The New York Times wrote, "Cory Michael Smith’s performance as Adrian is a quiet marvel in a movie that’s superbly acted all around. The film’s intimate consideration of still-enormous issues is intelligent, surprising and emotionally resonant." ABC News also reviewed the film positively, writing, "Most of the scenes are staged between Adrian and one other person, and this decision to draw out the intimacy of the pair in the frame accentuates the poignancy of things not said."

1985 was given multiple prizes like the Grand Jury Prize at the SXSW Texas Competition, the Festival Best Feature at FIRE!! Mostra, the Audience Award and the Student Jury Prize at the Champs-Élysées Film Festival in Paris, the Grand Jury Award and the Best Screenwriting award at the Outfest Los Angeles LGBTQ Film Festival and the awards of: Best Feature Film, Best Writer for Yen Tan, Best Actor for Cory Michael Smith, Best Supporting Actor for Michael Chiklis, Best Supporting Actress for Jamie Chung at the Queen Palm International Film Festival.

References

External links
 
 
 Home for Christmas an interview with Yen Tan at Eye for Film

2018 films
2018 independent films
2018 drama films
2018 LGBT-related films
American drama films
American Christmas drama films
American LGBT-related films
2010s English-language films
Films directed by Yen Tan
Films set in Texas
Films set in 1985
Gay-related films
HIV/AIDS in American films
LGBT-related drama films
American black-and-white films
Films shot in 16 mm film
Features based on short films
2010s American films